Marco Amleto Belelli, or Divino Otelma, (born 8 May 1949) is an Italian television personality, politician and singer.

Biography
In 1965 Belelli joined the Giovane Italia (an organization near to the Italian Social Movement), but in 1967 became a member of the Christian Democracy and of the Workers' Christian Movement.
In 1975 he took the degree in political science in Genoa and joined the ISPI school in Milan. In the same year he started to appreciate the Radical Party and its leader Marco Pannella.

In 1977, he became a magician and named himself Otelma, that is the opposite of his middle name (later he would change it in divino Otelma), and began to join different television programs. Divino Otelma says he believes in reincarnation and says that he is the incarnation of God and that he was in the past a priest from Atlantis, a woman pharaoh and one of the Quindecimviri sacris faciundis. He defines himself Count of Quistello, First Theurgist of the Church of the Livings, Great Master of the Theurgical Order of Helios, European President of the Order of Occultists of Europe, National President of the Order of Italian Occultists, President of the Italian Centre of Astrological Studies and of the Astrological-Occultist Union of Italy, Source of Life and Salvation, Dispenser of Archetypal Truth, Light of Livings.

In 1991, he founded the political party Europa 2000 and in 2003 he took his second degree, in history.

Criminal proceedings
In 1987 Belelli  was convicted of taking advantage of a disabled person; he was also tried for defamation, tax noncompliance and false advertising.

Works 
 Il libro dei segreti, Genova, Il Basilisco, 1984
 Il Libro di Orion o del Domani Perfetto, Genova, Il Basilisco, 1985
 Magia, Genova, Il Basilisco, 1993
 La magia del Terzo millennio, Roma, L'Airone, 2000, .
 Occasus mundi. Teorie sulla fine del mondo, Genova, ECIG, 2013, .

Discography 
 Potenza sessuale 3000, Bit Records, 2005 (cd)
 Prendi la fortuna, Bit Records, 2005 (cd)
 Il CD divino, Bit Records, 2006 (album)
 Escluso, Bit Records, 2008 (ep)
 Ti voglio, Senza Base Records, 2010 (cd)
 The best of Il Divino Otelma, Senza Base Records, 2012 ("Utor Kalem")
 Baia del sol, Bit Records, 2012 (cd with "Rossano Rubicondi")
 Mai dire Maya, Bit Records, 2012 (cd)

Sources
Biography

External links
Official website

1949 births
Living people
Italian male singers
Radical Party (Italy) politicians
20th-century Italian politicians
Italian television personalities
Mass media people from Genoa
Politicians from Genoa
Musicians from Genoa
Italian psychics